St. Paul's Reformed Church may refer to:

 St. Paul's Reformed Church (Startown, North Carolina)
 St. Paul's Reformed Church (Navarre, Ohio)

See also
St. Paul's Church (disambiguation)